Krzysztof Władysław Czarnecki (born 25 October 1957 in Trzcianka) is a Polish politician. He was elected to the Sejm on 25 September 2005, getting 3406 votes in 38 Piła district as a candidate from the Law and Justice list.

See also
Members of Polish Sejm 2005-2007

References

External links
Krzysztof Czarnecki - parliamentary page - includes declarations of interest, voting record, and transcripts of speeches.

1957 births
Living people
People from Trzcianka
Law and Justice politicians
Centre Agreement politicians
Members of the Polish Sejm 2005–2007
Members of the Polish Sejm 2019–2023